The Finnish Open is a darts tournament that began in 1981. It was abandoned for a year before being recurred in 1983 where it has been held annually.

List of tournaments

Tournament records
 Most wins 2:  Martin Adams,  Mervyn King,  Mike Gregory,  Raymond van Barneveld,  John Lowe. 
 Most Finals 3: Mervyn King,  Mike Gregory,  Raymond van Barneveld,  Jann Hoffmann . 
 Most Semi Finals 4:  Jarkko Komula.
 Most Quarter Finals 5:  Mervyn King,  Ulf Ceder,  Marko Pusa,  Bob Taylor,  Matt Clark.
 Most Appearances 8:  Sami Sanssi.
 Most Prize Money won €3,384:  Robert Wagner.
 Best winning average (95.67) :  Daniel Larsson   v's  Madars Razma, 2015, Semi Final .
 Youngest Winner age 23:   Jeffrey de Graaf. 
 Oldest Winner age 46:  John Lowe.

See also
List of BDO ranked tournaments
List of WDF tournaments

References

External links
Finnish Darts Organization

1979 establishments in Finland
Darts tournaments